Ants Soots (born on 19 February 1956 in Rõngu) is an Estonian conductor.

In 1983 he graduated from Tallinn State Conservatory.

1982-1990 he was a singer of Mixed Choir of Eesti Televisioon and Eesti Raadio.

He has directed the following choirs: Forestalia (1976–1991), Academic Male Choir of Tallinn University of Technology (1981–1986), Male Choir of the Estonian Academy of Sciences (1986–1991), Female Choir of the Estonian Academy of Sciences (1990–1991) and Estonian National Male Choir (1991–2005). He has worked as a lecturer at the Estonian Academy of Music since 1988, and as a professor since 2004.

Awards:
 2003: Order of the White Star, V class.
 2004: Grammy Award for Best Choral Performance. Paavo Järvi (conductor), Tiia-Ester Loitme and Ants Soots (chorus masters) for Sibelius: Cantatas performed by the Ellerhein Girls' Choir, the Estonian National Male Choir and the Estonian National Symphony Orchestra.

References

Living people
1956 births
Estonian conductors (music)
Estonian choral conductors
Estonian educators
Estonian Academy of Music and Theatre alumni
Academic staff of the Estonian Academy of Music and Theatre
Recipients of the Order of the White Star, 5th Class
Grammy Award winners
People from Elva Parish